Air Force School (Coimbatore) was set up to provide education to the children of the Indian Air Force (IAF) personnel.

The school is an unaided private co-educational institute affiliated to the Central Board of Secondary Education (CBSE). It is a day school for the students in the age group  to 15. It has classes from Kindergarten to Class X.

Its motto is विद्या ददाति विनयम्, which is Sanskrit for "knowledge gives education".

Foundation
Air Force School Coimbatore was founded by the Air Officer Commanding-in-Chief of Training Command, IAF. It was established in a temporary building with the aim of providing comprehensive education to the children of Officers and Airmen of the Indian Air Force. The school got its permanent building in Red Fields Coimbatore-641018.

Air Force School, Red Fields, Coimbatore is run by the IAF Educational and Cultural Society.

Although the school was established primarily for the benefit of children belonging to IAF personnel, it has been always open to the wards of Army and Navy personnel, as well as to civilians.

Management
The Board of Managing Committee of the School is headed by the Commandant AFAC (Air Force Administrative College) Red Fields, Coimbatore-641018 which is under administrative control of Training Command (TC), headquartered at Bangalore. The Committee consists of some officers of the Indian Air Force and two elected representatives of the teaching staff and one elected representative of the parents. The Board of Governors, presided over by the Air Officer in charge of Administration, Air Headquarters is the body for all the schools run by the IAF Education Society. The Principal looks after the administration and the academics, assisted by the Vice Principal and the Head of the Department of each faculty.

Affiliations
The school is a co-educational public school. The school is affiliated to the Central Board of Secondary Education and students are prepared for the All India Secondary School Examination (Class X). The school is a member of the Indian Public Schools' Conference (IPSC) and also of National Progressive Schools' Conference (NPSC).

Awards
Air Force School Coimbatore have been awarded "The Best Air Force School" at Secondary Level for CBSE Results for four consecutive years from 2006–2007 to 2011–2012.

Site
The school site, is situated just behind Nalanda Building of AFAC and have two entrance; one from AFAC campus and another behind Coimbatore Circuit house.  No 6 Air Force Hospital, Red Fields Coimbatore provides medical assistance to the students and conduct annual medical check ups.

Co-curricular
Co-curricular activities are activities performed by students that fall outside the realm of the curriculum of the school or education.  It brings out the talents, team-spirit, creativity, knowledge and self-development of the students.  Students are divided into four houses viz. Arjan, Sekhon, Subroto and Katre. Each house has a house Captain and Vice Captain along with House Teachers to guide the students for  internal competitions. The teacher in-charge of the CCA organizes and co-ordinates the Inter-house competitions like music - instrumental and vocal, dance, painting, sculpture, debate, quiz, one-act play, slogan writing, and creative writing.

The school has clubs with a teacher in-charge for each and club secretaries are nominated from each club. These are Nature and Science Club, Health and Wellness Club, Philanthropy Club, Literature Club, Maths and Cyber Club Gardening and Shramdan Club and Adolescents' Education Program.

The school celebrates Sports Day every year and Annual Day every consecutive year.

Other Air Force schools in India
 No. 1 Air Force School, Gwalior
 Air Force School Coimbatore
 Air Force Bal Bharati School, Lodi Road
 Air Force Golden Jubilee Institute
 The Air Force School (Subroto Park)

References 

Educational institutions established in 1952
Indian Air Force
Boarding schools in Tamil Nadu
Primary schools in Tamil Nadu
High schools and secondary schools in Tamil Nadu
Schools in Coimbatore
1952 establishments in Madras State